The following highways are numbered 737:

Canada
  Saskatchewan Highway 737

Costa Rica
  National Route 737

United States
  Louisiana Highway 737
  Pennsylvania Route 737
  Farm to Market Road 737, two different former roads in Texas